The Drummer's Fate is a 1955 Soviet drama film directed by Viktor Eisymont. It is based on the 1939 book of the same name by Arkady Gaidar.

Plot 
In the life of Sergei Batashov, a young drummer of a pioneer organization, trouble comes. His father, an engineer at a secret factory, is arrested for losing documents. Guilty of this his stepmother marries and leaves Sergei alone.

Using the trustfulness of the boy left to himself in the Batashovs' apartment, a criminal espionage organization was established. Introducing themselves as distant relatives of the boy, they use it for their own purposes, forcing them to acquaint them with his father's colleagues.

Cast
 Daniil Sagal as Batashov  
 Sergei Yasinsky as Sergei Batashov  
 Alla Larionova as Valentina  
 Andrei Abrikosov as Polovtsev 
 Viktor Khokhryakov as uncle Vasya 
 Klavdia Polovikova as old women
 Aleksandr Lebedev as Yurka  
 Vasily Krasnoshchyokov as Kryuchkonosy (Hook-nosed)
 Leonid Pirogov as old man Yakov  
 Nikolai Timofeyev as Grachkovsky  
 Borya Burlyaev as Slavka Grachkovsky
 Valentina Telegina as aunt Tanya
 Mikhail Gluzsky as policeman
 Georgy Millyar as Nikolya (fr. Nicolas)

References

External links 
 

1955 films
Soviet drama films
1950s Russian-language films
Films based on young adult literature
Films based on Russian novels
Soviet black-and-white films
Gorky Film Studio films
1955 drama films